The 115th Brigade was an infantry brigade formation of the British Army raised during both the First and Second World War.

First World War
It was raised as part of the new army also known as Kitchener's Army and assigned to the 38th (Welsh) Division. With the division, the brigade saw service on the Western Front.

Order of battle
The 115th Brigade was constituted as follows during the First World War:
 16th (Service) Battalion (Cardiff City), Welsh Regiment (from October 1914, disbanded February 1918)
 10th (Service) Battalion (1st Gwent), South Wales Borderers (from November 1914) 
 11th (Service) Battalion (2nd Gwent), South Wales Borderers (from January 1915, disbanded February 1918)
 17th (Service) Battalion (2nd North Wales), Royal Welsh Fusiliers (from July 1915)
 2nd Battalion, Royal Welsh Fusiliers (from February 1918)
 115th Machine Gun Company, Machine Gun Corps (joined 19 May 1916, moved to 38th Battalion, Machine Gun Corps March 1918)
 115th Mortar Battery (joined 26 December 1915)

Second World War

Disbanded after the war the brigade number was reactivated in the Territorial Army (TA), the British Army's part-time reserve, as the 115th Infantry Brigade shortly before the start of the Second World War, this time composed of three TA battalions of the Royal Welch Fusiliers, the 8th, 9th and 10th. The brigade spent most of the war in the United Kingdom as part of the 38th (Welsh) Infantry Division. From 2 August 1944, it formed Force 135 which was planning the reoccupation of the Channel Islands. In the event, the plan did not go ahead, and the brigade left Force 135 on 30 January 1945. On 12 February, it moved to North West Europe where it remained until the end of the war, serving variously under the direct command of VIII, XII and I Corps.

Order of battle
The 115th Infantry Brigade was constituted as follows during the war:
 8th (Denbighshire) Battalion, Royal Welch Fusiliers (to 4 July 1944)
 9th (Caernarvonshire and Anglesey) Battalion, Royal Welch Fusiliers (to 11 October 1943)
 10th (Merionethshire and Montgomeryshire) Battalion, Royal Welch Fusiliers (to 25 July 1942, became 6th (Royal Welch) Battalion, Parachute Regiment)
 115th Infantry Brigade Anti-Tank Company (formed 1 January 1940, disbanded 12 January 1943)
 13th Battalion, Royal Welch Fusiliers (from 7 November 1942 to 4 July 1944)
 9th Battalion, Somerset Light Infantry (from 24 October 1943 to 4 July 1944)
 1st Battalion, Cheshire Regiment (from 28 August 1944 to 3 April 1945)
 4th Battalion, Northamptonshire Regiment (from 28 August 1944)
 30th Battalion, Royal Berkshire Regiment (from 27 August 1944 to 15 March 1945)
 5th (Hackney) Battalion, Royal Berkshire Regiment (from 1 April 1945)
 3rd Battalion, Monmouthshire Regiment (from 8 April 1945)

References

Bibliography
 

Infantry brigades of the British Army in World War I
Infantry brigades of the British Army in World War II
B115